God and gender may refer to:

 Gender of God
 Gender in Bible translation
 Gender and religion